Ping Shan North is one of the 39 constituencies in the Yuen Long District of Hong Kong.

The constituency returns one district councillor to the Yuen Long District Council, with an election every four years. Ping Shan North constituency is loosely based on northern part of Ping Shan with estimated population of 14,237.

Councillors represented

Election results

2010s

References

Ping Shan
Constituencies of Hong Kong
Constituencies of Yuen Long District Council
1991 establishments in Hong Kong
Constituencies established in 1991